Darker Magazine is a Russian monthly horror webzine. It covers various sorts of horror media, including slasher, splatter, exploitation films, as well as horror literature, videogames, comic books and dark music. The magazine is in regular publication since April, 2011. It is part of Russian Horror Web. It publishes articles, interviews, reviews and short stories by Russian and foreign authors. The zine also helds an annual literary contest “The Devil's Dozen”, which is the largest among horror stories in Russian. Darker Magazine is a cult outlet in Russian Internet horror segment, and its mission is support of horror in Russia. It is published on the initiative and with the assistance of The Horror Authors Association and Horror Web media network. The zine is funded by its subscribers.

History 
Darker was founded in 2011 succeeding another webzine The Darkness. Darkness''' editor Mikhail Parfenov ran the new project that soon became even more successful than its predecessor. The first issue of Darker Magazine has been released on April 21, 2011 and since then has been publishing every month on 20th. Since that time Darker released a lot of reviews of books and movies and also interviews with notable horrormakers.

Notable authorsDARKER'' has been first in Russia to translate some short stories by such horror authors as H.P. Lovecraft, Clive Barker, Tomas Ligotti, Jeff Vandermeer, Graham Masterton, Christopher Golden, Joe Lansdale, Ramsey Campbell, Robert McCammon, Adam Nevill, Ken Liu, Gwendolyn Kiste, Matthew Stokoe  S.T. Joshi and more. Also publish for the first time some short stories of the famous Russian writers as Mariya Galina, Svyatoslav Loginov, Anna Starobinets. The zine also publishes interviews with notable horror figures, and among them are Mike Flanagan, Lin Shaye, Chris Walas, Brian Lumley, Ryuhei Kitamura, Mick Garris, André Øvredal.

Critics 
Famous British author Graham Masterton notes the educational role of Darker Magazine:[…] to make horror popular and to bring together a community of people who find horror exciting, frightening, wildly imaginative and highly creative. DARKER does the same for Russia. There is a wonderful tradition of dark and disturbing literature in Russia. […] DARKER is helping to breathe life back into that tradition and I admire your courage and determination in doing that.

Notable contributors
 Mikhail Parfenov — creator of the webzine
 Svyatoslav Loginov — veteran of Russian science fiction
 Mariya Galina — Russian horror writer and translator 
Alexei Sholokhov — Russian horror writer

Awards

Literature 

 Nesterik, Ella, Kazbekova, Maiya, Supernatural Horror in English Literature and Means of it Realization, European Researcher (2014)
 Ksenia Olkusz, Zombie w kulturze, Ośrodek Badawczy Facta Ficta (2015)
 Ksenia Olkusz, Krzysztof M. Maj, Narracje fantastyczne, Ośrodek Badawczy Facta Ficta (2018)
 Nosachev, Pavel, The Influences of Western Esoterecism on Russian Rock Poetry of the Turn if the Century, Faculty of Philology, University of Belgrade (2018)

References

External links
 Darker official site

2011 establishments in Russia
Horror fiction magazines
Magazines established in 2011
Science fiction magazines published in Russia
Russian-language magazines
Horror fiction websites